Fatin Nurfatehah Mat Salleh (born ) is a Malaysian female compound archer and part of the national team. She won the gold medal at Archery World Cup, Stage 1 (2015). She also won bronze medal at the 2015 Asian Archery Championships in the women's team event.

References

1991 births
Living people
Malaysian female archers
Place of birth missing (living people)
Archers at the 2010 Commonwealth Games
Southeast Asian Games silver medalists for Malaysia
Southeast Asian Games bronze medalists for Malaysia
Southeast Asian Games medalists in archery
Archers at the 2018 Asian Games
Competitors at the 2009 Southeast Asian Games
Competitors at the 2019 Southeast Asian Games
Asian Games competitors for Malaysia
Commonwealth Games competitors for Malaysia
Competitors at the 2021 Southeast Asian Games
Southeast Asian Games gold medalists for Malaysia
20th-century Malaysian women
21st-century Malaysian women